.bz is the Internet country code top-level domain (ccTLD) for Belize. It is administered by the University of Belize.

At one point, .bz domains were being marketed by an American company as standing for "business", and that company took legal action against ICANN in an attempt to block the .biz domain as "unfair competition".  Currently, the registry is in Belize, but is still marketing the domain outside the country as "meaning business".  Internationalized domains with a wide assortment of non-ASCII characters are also available.

Many websites in Italy use this domain, because of the abbreviation of Bolzano, the capital of the province of South Tyrol, and the fact that the official abbreviation of the province is BZ. Many websites use the Italian subdomain .bz.it. Servers for the Open Source game BZFlag often use names ending in .bz.

There are some second-level domains in use, however these are not required:
 com.bz (commercial)
 edu.bz (educational)
 gov.bz (government)
 net.bz (networking)
 org.bz (organizations)

It also might have use for typosquatting for misspellings of .biz domains.

See also
Internet in Belize

References

External links
 IANA .bz whois information
 ICANN advisory about lawsuit
 .bz Requirements and FAQs

Country code top-level domains
Telecommunications in Belize

sv:Toppdomän#B